This is a list of the 630 members of the Italian Chamber of Deputies that were elected in the 2013 general election.

The Government

Partito Democratico

New Centre-right

Civic Choice

For Italy

Democratic Centre
Roberto Capelli
Aniello Formisano
Carmelo Lo Monte
Pino Pisicchio
Bruno Tabacci

Italian Socialist Party
Marco Di Lello
Pia Elda Locatelli
Oreste Pastorelli

South Tyrolean People's Party/Trentino Tyrolean Autonomist Party
Daniel Alfreider
Renate Gebhard
Mauro Ottobre
Albrecht Plangger
Manfred Schullian

Associative Movement Italians Abroad/South American Union Italian Emigrants
Mario Borghese
Franco Bruno
Renata Bueno
Ricardo Antonio Merlo

The Opposition

Five Star Movement

Forza Italia

Left Ecology Freedom

Lega Nord

Brothers of Italy
Edmondo Cirielli
Massimo Enrico Corsaro
Ignazio La Russa
Pasquale Maietta
Giorgia Meloni
Gaetano Nastri
Marcello Taglialatela
Achille Totaro

Independents
Ivan Catalano
Alessandro Furnari
Vincenza Labriola
Edoardo Nesi
Mauro Pili
Alessio Tacconi
Adriano Zaccagnini

References

 
Lists of political office-holders in Italy
Lists of legislators by term
Lists of members of parliament